The Humuya River is a river in Honduras which passes through Santa Rita, Yoro, and then flows into the Ulúa River.

See also
List of rivers of Honduras

References

Rivers of Honduras